Agnia eximia is a species of beetle in the family Cerambycidae. It was described by Francis Polkinghorne Pascoe in 1860. It is known from Moluccas.

Varietas
 Agnia eximia var. abasomaculata Gressitt, 1950
 Agnia eximia var. albofasciata Breuning, 1944

References

Lamiini
Beetles described in 1860